The Exchange Building is a 19-story skyscraper, which  was formerly known as the Cotton Exchange Building and the Merchants Exchange Building, and is the twelfth-tallest building in Memphis, Tennessee. It should not be confused with the Memphis Cotton Exchange which is located on Front Street and Union Avenue. The Exchange Building is located at the corner of Second Street and Madison Avenue in downtown Memphis, Tennessee. The building is made of steel and concrete, and employs many decorative elements including Tennessee marble, granite, and detailed plaster work.

Location
The building, which has an alternate address of 130 Madison Avenue, sits on 0.25 acres at the northwest corner of Madison Avenue and Second Street, just south of Court Square, Memphis.

History

The building was built in 1910 by the Memphis Cotton and Merchants Exchange.  Locally, it became known as the "Exchange Building."  The building was designed by Memphis architect Neander Montgomery Woods Jr. in the Beaux Arts style.

The Exchange Building was added to the National Register of Historic Places in 1979.  The building is listed as the Memphis Merchants Exchange in the National Register of Historic Places listings in Shelby County, Tennessee.

Current use
The building is used as a mixed use building with hotel units and residential apartments, with occupancy that includes the top floors. Conversion to residential use was completed in 1996. The building houses 202 units, including handicap equipped housing units.

See also
List of tallest buildings in Memphis
Downtown Memphis
 National Register of Historic Places listings in Shelby County, Tennessee

References

External links

Emporis Listing of building

Skyscraper hotels in Memphis, Tennessee
Residential buildings completed in 1910
Residential skyscrapers in Memphis, Tennessee
Residential buildings on the National Register of Historic Places in Tennessee
Beaux-Arts architecture in Tennessee
National Register of Historic Places in Memphis, Tennessee
1910 establishments in Tennessee